Charlotte Schultz may refer to:

 Charlotte Mailliard Shultz (born 1933), American heiress and socialite
 Charlotte Schultz (actress) (1899–1946), German stage and film actress